Ecsenius fijiensis is a species of combtooth blenny in the genus Ecsenius. It is found in coral reefs in the western central Pacific ocean, around the Fiji Islands. It can reach a maximum length of 3.9 centimetres. Blennies in this species feed primarily off of benthic algae and weeds.

References

External links
 

fijiensis
Fish described in 1988
Taxa named by Victor G. Springer